Marion Suplee (born June 7, 1909 – August 13, 1985) known professionally as Marion Martin was an American film and stage actress.

Biography
Martin was born in Philadelphia, Pennsylvania, the daughter of a Bethlehem Steel executive. She became an actress after her family fortune was lost in the Wall Street Crash of 1929, and appeared in the Broadway productions Lombardi Ltd. and Sweet Adeline.

She made her film debut in She's My Lillie, I'm Her Willie and subsequently played minor roles,  often as showgirls. Several of her early roles were in musicals and she achieved some success as a singer.  By the end of the decade she had played leading female roles in several "B" pictures, playing one of her most notable roles in James Whale's Sinners in Paradise (1938). Despite her success she was often cast in minor roles in more widely seen films such as His Girl Friday (1940). The majority of her roles were in comedies but she also appeared in dramas such as Boom Town (1940) in which she played a dance hall singer who is briefly romanced by Clark Gable.  She played secondary roles in three Lupe Vélez "Mexican Spitfire" films in the early 1940s, and was a comic foil for the Marx Brothers in The Big Store, where the back of her skirt is cut away by Harpo.

She played a ghost in Gildersleeve's Ghost, and was the subject of a legendary fistfight between Gildersleeve star Harold Peary and Warner Bros studio mogul Bud Stevens at the Mocambo nightclub in 1943. Her more substantial roles included Alice Angel, a dizzy showgirl, in the murder mystery Lady of Burlesque with Barbara Stanwyck and Angel on My Shoulder. She also appeared in The Big Street (1942) with Lucille Ball, in the western The Woman of the Town with Claire Trevor and in The Great Mike at PRC in 1944.

By the late 1940s, her roles were often minor. Three Stooges fans will remember her as western cowgirl Gladys in Merry Mavericks. She played "Belle Farnol" in a 1950 episode of The Lone Ranger entitled "Pardon for Curley". Shortly afterward, she made her final film appearance in 1952. Married to a physicist, Martin retired, and although she expressed the desire to return to show business, suitable roles were not offered to her.

Personal
She was awarded a star at 6915 Hollywood Boulevard on the Hollywood Walk of Fame for her contributions to motion pictures. She died of cardiac arrest in 1985 in Los Angeles, California, and was buried in Holy Cross Cemetery in Culver City, California.

Partial filmography 

 Crime Without Passion (1934) as Theatre Cashier (uncredited)
 Sinners in Paradise (1938) as Iris Compton
 Personal Secretary (1938) as Girl in Office (uncredited)
 Youth Takes a Fling (1938) as Girl on Beach
 The Storm (1938) as Jane, Bar Girl
 His Exciting Night (1938) as Gypsy McCoy
 Pirates of the Skies (1939) as Kitty
 Sergeant Madden (1939) as Charlotte LePage
 Invitation to Happiness (1939) as Lola Snow
 The Man in the Iron Mask (1939) as Mlle. de la Valliere
 Invisible Stripes (1939) as Blonde (uncredited)
 His Girl Friday (1940) as Evangeline (uncredited)
 Women in War (1940) as Starr's Date (uncredited)
 Untamed (1940) as 2nd Girl in Limousine (uncredited)
 Scatterbrain (1940) (uncredited)
 Boom Town (1940) as Whitey
 Ellery Queen, Master Detective (1940) as Cornelia
 Tall, Dark and Handsome (1941) as Dawn
 Blonde Inspiration (1941) as Wanda
 The Lady from Cheyenne (1941) as Gertie (uncredited)
 The Big Store (1941) as Peggy Arden
 Cracked Nuts (1941) as Flashy Blonde in Corridor (uncredited)
 Lady Scarface (1941) as Ruby, aka Mary Jordan
 New Wine (1941) as Mitzi
 Weekend for Three (1941) as Mrs. Weatherby
 The Mexican Spitfire's Baby (1941) as Fifi
 Harvard, Here I Come! (1941) as Oomphie (uncredited)
 Fly-by-Night (1942) as Blond Nurse
 Call Out the Marines (1942) as Pretty Blonde on Tour (uncredited)
 Mexican Spitfire at Sea (1942) as Fifi Russell
 Powder Town (1942) as Sue, Blonde Piano Player
 Tales of Manhattan (1942) as 'Squirrel'
 The Big Street (1942) as Mimi Venus
 Mexican Spitfire's Elephant (1942) as Diana De Corro
 Star Spangled Rhythm (1942) as Wife, Bob Hope Skit (uncredited)
 The McGuerins from Brooklyn (1942) as Myrtle, Marcia's friend
 They Got Me Covered (1943) as Gloria
 Lady of Burlesque (1943) as Alice Angel
 Swingtime Johnny (1943) as Flashy Blonde
 The Woman of the Town (1943) as Daisy Davenport
 Sweethearts of the U.S.A. (1944) as Ghost of Josephine
 It Happened Tomorrow (1944) as Nurse (uncredited)
 Gildersleeve's Ghost (1944) as Terry Vance
 The Merry Monahans (1944) as Soubrette
 Irish Eyes Are Smiling (1944) as Prima Donna (uncredited)
 Mystery of the River Boat (1944, Serial) as Celeste Eltree
 The Great Mike (1944) as Kitty Tremaine
 Eadie Was a Lady (1945) as Rose Allure
 The Phantom Speaks (1945) as Betty Hanzel
 Penthouse Rhythm (1945) as Irma King
 Gangs of the Waterfront (1945) as Rita
 On Stage Everybody (1945) as Bubbles (uncredited)
 Abbott and Costello in Hollywood (1945) as Miss Milbane
 Girls of the Big House (1945) as Dixie
 Cinderella Jones (1946) as Burlesque Queen
 Suspense (1946) as Shooting Gallery Blond (uncredited)
 Deadline for Murder (1946) as Laura Gibson
 Queen of Burlesque (1946) as Lola Cassell
 Black Angel (1946) as Millie
 Angel on My Shoulder (1946) as Mrs. Bentley
 Nobody Lives Forever (1946) as Lou, Blonde (uncredited)
 That Brennan Girl (1946) as Marion, Natalie's Girl Friend
 Lighthouse (1947) as JoJo, The Blonde
 New Orleans (1947) as Blonde Cashier (uncredited)
 That's My Gal (1947) as Pepper
 State of the Union (1948) as Blonde Girl (uncredited)
 Thunder in the Pines (1948) as Pearl
 My Dream Is Yours (1949) as Blonde at Club Babita (uncredited)
 Come to the Stable (1949) as Rossi's Manicurist (uncredited)
 Oh, You Beautiful Doll (1949) as Big Blonde (uncredited)
 Key to the City (1950) as Emmy
 Dakota Lil (1950) as Blonde Singer
 Journey Into Light (1951) as Diana
 Oklahoma Annie (1952) as La Belle La Tour (uncredited) (final film role)

References

External links

 
 
 
 Allmovie biography from the New York Times

1909 births
1985 deaths
American film actresses
American stage actresses
Burials at Holy Cross Cemetery, Culver City
Actresses from Philadelphia
20th-century American actresses